Oksana Kotova (born 21 December 1974) is a Kazakhstani cross-country skier. She competed in five events at the 1994 Winter Olympics.

References

External links
 

1974 births
Living people
Kazakhstani female cross-country skiers
Olympic cross-country skiers of Kazakhstan
Cross-country skiers at the 1994 Winter Olympics
Place of birth missing (living people)